N66 may refer to:

Roads 
 N66 road (Ireland)
 Calamba–Pagsanjan Road, in the Philippines
 Nebraska Highway 66, in the United States

Other uses 
 N66 (Long Island bus)
 , a submarine of the Royal Navy
 Oneonta Municipal Airport, in Otsego County, New York, United States

See also
 66N (disambiguation)